Kilburn railway station is located on the Gawler line.in 1920 it was painted green for a short time.

History

The station opened in 1915 as Chicago to serve the Adelaide suburb of the same name.  In the 1920s the station and suburb were renamed Kilburn.

To the west of the station lies the Australian Rail Track Corporation standard gauge line to Crystal Brook.

Services by platform

References

Railway stations in Adelaide